Anx or ANX may refer to:
Anx (brachiopod), a brachiopod genus
Anx, List of Star Wars races (A-E), an alien race in Star Wars
Anx (album), a 2012 album by the hip hop duo Dark Time Sunshine

Acronyms and codes
Anadis, a small biotech company
Andøya Airport, Andenes, from its IATA airport code
Automotive Network Exchange
All Night Express uses these initials in ROH wrestling
 Anx, short for "Annex"; a Street suffix as used in the US